Kelsey Laine Wys (born February 4, 1991) is an American soccer coach and former professional player who played as a goalkeeper. She currently serves as an assistant coach for the Appalachian State Mountaineers.

Playing career

College
Wys attended Florida State University and played for the Seminoles from 2010 to 2013.

Club

Western New York Flash
In January 2014, Wys was selected by the Western New York Flash in the second round (18th selection overall) of the 2014 NWSL College Draft. She made her debut for the team on May 11, 2014, during a home match against Sky Blue FC. During the game, Wys provided a direct assist to striker Abby Wambach, a first for a goalkeeper in the league.

Washington Spirit
In 2015, Wys was traded to the Washington Spirit in exchange for goalkeeper Chantel Jones. She made her debut for the Spirit during a 3–1 defeat to Seattle Reign FC in Seattle on 2 May. Wys started in 11 games for the Spirit in 2015. The Coral Springs, Fla native tallied 35 saves and three shutouts. In 2016, Wys started 12 regular season matches and both post season matches for the Spirit.

After four seasons with the Spirit, Wys was waived ahead of the 2019 season to pursue opportunities overseas.

Loan to Newcastle Jets
In November 2016, Wys joined Australian club Newcastle Jets on a season long loan. In her 3rd match, on November 20, 2016, Wys tore her anterior cruciate ligament ruling her out for the rest of the season.

UMF Selfoss
In April 2019, Wys joined UMF Selfoss of the Icelandic Úrvalsdeild kvenna. On 17 August 2019, she helped Selfoss defeat KR, 2–1, in the Icelandic Cup finals, securing the club's first major trophy.

Coaching career

Appalachian State
In February 2020, Wys was announced as an assistant coach for the women's soccer team at Appalachian State University.

In February 2022, Wys was announced as goalkeeper coach at the University of Missouri.

Personal
Wys currently resides in Columbia, Missouri. Wys reportedly spends her time off the pitch managing a grade V bilateral quad strain.

References

External links 

 
 Washington Spirit player profile
 Florida State Seminoles player profile

1991 births
Living people
American women's soccer players
Florida State Seminoles women's soccer players
Newcastle Jets FC (A-League Women) players
National Women's Soccer League players
Parade High School All-Americans (girls' soccer)
Kelsey Wys
Kelsey Wys
A-League Women players
Washington Spirit players
Western New York Flash draft picks
Western New York Flash players
Women's association football goalkeepers
American expatriate women's soccer players
American expatriate sportspeople in Australia
American expatriate sportspeople in Iceland
Expatriate women's footballers in Iceland
Expatriate women's soccer players in Australia
Appalachian State Mountaineers coaches
College women's soccer coaches in the United States